Laura Barden (born 6 September 1994) is an Australian field hockey player. She plays the position of forward. She is a member of the 2017 Australian women's national field hockey team.

Early life and education 
Laura Barden is from Melbourne. She moved to Kew, Victoria. She was a scholarship recipient from the University of Melbourne.

Career 
Barden was a member of the 2014 Women's National Junior Squad for Australia. The following year she was moved up to the Australian women's national field hockey team, known as the Hockeyroos, in September 2015. She was not chosen for Australia's team for the 2016 Summer Olympics, however, by January 2017 Barden had played in 15 games and scored 4 goals in her time with the team. She was again part of the Hockeyroos team for the 2017 Hawkes Bay Cup. Barden scored Australia's only goal in an April 2017 game against New Zealand at the Festival of Hockey. Although Barden was initially named to the 2017 Oceania Cup team, she was later ruled out because of a quad injury.

In addition to playing for the Hockeyroos, Barden also plays for Camberwell Hockey Club.

References 

Living people
1994 births
People educated at Carey Baptist Grammar School
Australian female field hockey players
21st-century Australian women
People from Kew, Victoria
University of Melbourne alumni
Field hockey players from Melbourne
Expatriate field hockey players
Australian expatriate sportspeople in the Netherlands
Sportswomen from Victoria (Australia)